Yeadon station may refer to:

 Yeadon railway station (England), a former train station in Yeadon, West Yorkshire, England
 Yeadon Loop station, a SEPTA trolley station in Philadelphia, Pennsylvania
 Fernwood–Yeadon station, a SEPTA Regional Rail station in Fernwood, Pennsylvania

See also
Yeadon (disambiguation)